The Badighat River or Badigad is a river in Gulmi District, Nepal.

References 

Gulmi District
Rivers of Lumbini Province